Marlen Serverovich Zmorka (born 1 July 1993) is a Ukrainian racing cyclist. He has twice been a medalist at the European road championships: bronze in 2010 and silver in 2015. He started cycling in 2008, and graduated from the Mykolaiv sports college.

Major results

2010
 3rd  Time trial, UEC European Junior Road Championships
2012
 3rd Road race, National Under-23 Road Championships
 4th Memorial Davide Fardelli
 5th Time trial, UEC European Under-23 Road Championships
 6th Time trial, UCI Under-23 Road World Championships
2013
 2nd Time trial, National Under-23 Road Championships
 4th Time trial, UEC European Under-23 Road Championships
 6th Trofeo Città di San Vendemiano
 7th ZLM Tour
 8th Gran Premio San Giuseppe
2014
 1st  Time trial, National Under-23 Road Championships
 6th Time trial, UEC European Under-23 Road Championships
 8th Circuito del Porto
2015
 1st  Time trial, National Under-23 Road Championships
 2nd  Time trial, UEC European Under-23 Road Championships
 5th Trofeo Città di San Vendemiano
 9th Time trial, UCI Under-23 Road World Championships
2016
 1st Stage 1 (TTT) Sharjah International Cycling Tour
 4th UAE Cup

References

External links

1993 births
Living people
Ukrainian male cyclists
Sportspeople from Mykolaiv